Simon Says is the debut album by the American bubblegum pop group the 1910 Fruitgum Company on the Buddah Records label. Released in 1968, it included two songs that appeared on the Billboard Hot 100—the most from any of the group's albums—although it was not their highest-charting album. It's been debated whether or not the members of the band actually played on the album since the Ohio Express, another band put together by Super K Productions (headed by Jerry Kasenetz and Jeffry Katz), actually consisted of two groups: one that produced the records and another that toured and promoted the name. This claim is disputed by original drummer Floyd Marcus, who has stated that all five men listed really were behind the instruments.

The album cover featured film strips from a photo shoot of the band members, a design that presumably inspired the cover of Swedish pop group Secret Service's 1979 single "Oh Susie"/"Give Me Your Love."

Track listing

Personnel
 Mark Gutkowski – Lead Singer and Organ Player
 Pat Karwan – lead guitar, vocals
 Frank Jeckell – rhythm guitar, vocals
 Steve Mortkowitz – bass guitar, vocals
 Floyd Marcus – drums, vocals

Charts

Singles

Releases 
 7-inch singles 

 1968/01/27 – BDA 24 
 "Simon Says" (Elliot Chiprut) – 2:19
 "Reflections From The Looking Glass" (Frank Jeckell, Mark Gutkowski, Ted Gutkowski) – 3:04

 1968/04/20 – BDA 39 
 "May I Take A Giant Step (Into Your Heart)" (Elliot Chiprut) – 2:24
 "(Poor Old) Mr. Jensen" (Jerry Kasenetz/Jeff Katz/David Taxin) – 2:15

 12" Album 

 1968/04 – BDM-1010 (Mono)
 1968/04 – BDS-5010 (Stereo) 

 CD 

 1989 – Repertoire Records RR 4019-C
 1992 – Unidisc Music BDK-5010

References

External links
 The Classic Bubblegum Music Page

1968 debut albums
1910 Fruitgum Company albums
Buddah Records albums